The 1985–86 Combined Counties Football League season was the eighth in the history of the Combined Counties Football League, a football competition in England.

The league was won by British Aerospace (Weybridge) for the second time. Newcomers Chertsey Town finished as runners-up and were promoted back to the Isthmian League.

League table

The league remained at 19 clubs after Southwick were promoted to the Isthmian League and one new club joined:
Chertsey Town, relegated from the Isthmian League.

References

External links
 Combined Counties League Official Site

1985-86
1985–86 in English football leagues